Amkal is a Russian football club. It is based in Moscow. Amkal is one of the most popular media football teams in Russia.

Amkal was founded in 2018. In 2022 the club was invited to participate in the 2022–23 Russian Cup.

Current squad 
As of 3 September 2022

References 

Association football clubs established in 2018
Football clubs in Russia
2018 establishments in Russia